Shaddam IV of House Corrino is a fictional character in the Dune universe created by Frank Herbert. He is Padishah Emperor of the Known Universe in Herbert's 1965 novel Dune. Shaddam's accession to the throne is chronicled in the Prelude to Dune prequel trilogy (1999–2001) by Brian Herbert and Kevin J. Anderson, and he later appears in the prequel series Heroes of Dune (2008–2009) and the Caladan Trilogy (2020–2022).

Born in year 10,134 A.G. (After Guild), Shaddam is the son of Elrood IX and the 81st member of House Corrino to occupy the Golden Lion Throne. Shaddam's closest friend is the assassin Count Hasimir Fenring, a cousin and childhood companion. Shaddam has five daughters—the Princesses Irulan, Chalice, Wensicia, Josifa, and Rugi—and no legal sons. His wife Anirul, a Bene Gesserit of Hidden Rank, died in 10,176 A.G.

Shaddam is described as "red-haired" by his daughter Irulan via epigraph in Dune, and noted to be 72 years old yet looking no older than 35. He is portrayed by José Ferrer in the 1984 David Lynch film adaptation Dune, by Giancarlo Giannini in the 2000 Dune miniseries and by Christopher Walken in the upcoming Dune: Part Two. In the 1984 film, Shaddam is said to be over 200 years old, as the Guild representatives remind him of the importance of the spice melange, which extends life.

Dune
During the events of the original novel Dune, Shaddam grants Duke Leto Atreides control of the harsh desert planet Arrakis, the only known source of the all-important spice. Though outwardly this seems like an opportunity for great wealth and power for House Atreides, Leto recognizes it as a trap; Shaddam feels threatened by Leto's rising popularity, and somehow intends to diminish or destroy him. Avoiding an overt attack, Shaddam instead uses the centuries-old feud between House Atreides and House Harkonnen to disguise his assault, enlisting the brilliant and power-hungry Baron Vladimir Harkonnen in his plan to trap and eliminate the Atreides. Shaddam's own power is secured by his fierce and seemingly unstoppable Sardaukar army; the Baron's ambush on Leto and his forces is bolstered by Sardaukar troops disguised as Harkonnens, and the Atreides are crushed. Leto is killed, but his Bene Gesserit concubine Lady Jessica and son Paul Atreides escape into the desert. They find sanctuary with a tribe of the planet's native Fremen.

Paul rises to power among the Fremen, whom he finds to be fierce fighters whose skills and numbers are underestimated by the Harkonnens. As the Fremen guerrilla "Muad'Dib", Paul soon manages to lead the Fremen in a widespread challenge to the Harkonnens' control of Arrakis. With the spice trade threatened, Shaddam arrives on Arrakis with his court and an escort of Sardaukar, intending to quickly end the disruption. However the Fremen, enhanced by Paul's training in Bene Gesserit martial arts, attack and manage to handily defeat the attendant Sardaukar forces. Making clear his ability and willingness to completely destroy all spice production should his terms not be met, Paul demands that Shaddam step down from the Imperial throne and install Paul in his place, with Irulan as Paul's consort. Shaddam has no choice but to concede, as an end to the spice supply would paralyze civilization across the entire universe. He is effectively exiled to his ancestral planet of Salusa Secundus, now a wasteland, prison planet, and training ground for the Sardaukar. According to Appendix IV: The Almanak en-Ashraf (Selected Excerpts of the Noble Houses) in Dune, Shaddam dies in 10,202 A.G. after 68 years of life.

The author's son, Brian Herbert, noted that Shaddam's age in Dune is slightly inconsistent. Though described as 72 years old at one point in the novel, in the appendix his birth and death years are recorded as 10,134–10,202 A.G., making him 68 years old at the time of his death. In 2005, Brian Herbert described this inconsistency in Shaddam's age:

Prelude to Dune
In the Prelude to Dune prequel trilogy (1999–2001), Shaddam is eager to succeed his father Elrood as Padishah Emperor, but despite his advanced age Elrood shows no signs of ill health. Shaddam finally tasks his longtime friend and minion Fenring to administer Elrood with an undetectable, slow-acting poison. Elrood finally dies in 10,156 A.G.; Shaddam had previously been complicit in the murder of his elder brother, the Crown Prince Fafnir, and had secretly administered contraceptives to his own mother, Habla, so she could not conceive another son to rival him. Shaddam secures his throne by paying the Spacing Guild with a supply of the spice and by arranging his own marriage to a Bene Gesserit. This union with the Lady Anirul Sadow-Tonkin results in five daughters, but no sons.

In adaptations
Shaddam is portrayed by José Ferrer in the 1984 David Lynch film adaptation Dune, and by Giancarlo Giannini in the 2000 Dune miniseries. Giannini also dubbed himself in the Italian version of the miniseries. Shaddam does not appear in the 2021 film Dune, which covers the first part of the book. The character will appear in the upcoming sequel film, Dune: Part Two, portrayed by Christopher Walken.

Family tree

References

Dune (franchise) characters
Fictional characters with slowed ageing
Fictional dictators
Fictional exiles
Fictional prisoners and detainees
Galactic emperors
Literary characters introduced in 1965
Male literary villains